The Nomo Peninsula in southern Nagasaki Prefecture, Kyushu, Japan is a peninsula extending 17 miles (27 km) south from the city center of downtown Nagasaki to Nomomachi on Kokudō 499.

The southernmost tip of the peninsula ends at the village of Nomomachi, with Mt. Gongen park area on the western side and Wakimisaki-machi on the south-eastern point, from where Kabashima Island is accessible by a permanent bridge.

See also
 National Parks of Japan

References

Parks and gardens in Nagasaki Prefecture
Protected areas established in 1955
1955 establishments in Japan